The 2021–22 Belgian Cup, called the Croky Cup for sponsorship reasons, was the 67th season of Belgium's annual football cup competition. The competition began on 25 July 2021 and ended with the final on 18 April 2022. The winners of the competition qualified for the 2022–23 UEFA Europa League play-off round.

Competition format
The competition consists of one preliminary round, followed by ten proper rounds. All rounds were single-match elimination rounds, with the exception of the semi-finals which are again held over two legs. When tied after 90 minutes in the first three rounds, penalties were taken immediately. From round four, when tied after 90 minutes first an extra time period of 30 minutes was played, then penalties were taken if still necessary.

Teams entered the competition in different rounds, based upon their 2021–22 league affiliation. Teams from the fifth-level Belgian Division 3 or lower began in round 1, with the exception of six teams from the Belgian Provincial Leagues which were randomly drawn to start in the preliminary round. Belgian Division 2 teams entered in round 2, Belgian National Division 1 teams entered in round 3, Belgian First Division B teams in round 5 (except two already in round 3) and finally the Belgian First Division A teams entered in round 6 (except two already in round 5).

Round and draw dates

Preliminary round
This round of matches were played on 25 July 2021 and included six teams playing in the Belgian Provincial Leagues.

First round
This round of matches were played on 31 July and 1 August 2021.

Second round
This round of matches was played on 7 and 8 August 2021 and included the 110 winners from the First Round together with 48 teams playing in the Belgian Division 2.

Third round
This round of matches were played from 14 till 18 August 2021 and includes the 79 winners from the Second Round together with 15 teams playing in the Belgian National Division 1 and 2 teams from the Belgian First Division B.

Fourth round
This round of matches were played from 21 till 25 of August 2021 and includes the 48 winners from the Third Round.

Fifth round
This round of matches was scheduled to be played on 29 August 2021 and included the 24 winners from the Fourth Round together with 6 teams from the Belgian First Division B and 2 teams from the Belgian First Division A. In the end, the matches were spread over multiple weeks, with the final fixture almost a month later on 21 September, mainly to accommodate the teams from the professional leagues which had already started their season.

Sixth round
The draw for the sixth round was made on 24 September 2021, a few days after the conclusion of the last match of the previous round. Newly entering at this round were the teams from the Belgian First Division A, with the exception of Union SG and Seraing which had entered in the prior round. The 16 teams entering at this stage were seeded and could not meet each other. The lowest team still in the competition was Onhaye, from the Belgian Division 3 (tier 5).

Seventh round
The draw for the seventh round was made on 28 October 2021, immediately after completion of the last match of round six between Westerlo and Antwerp. Lommel and Westerlo, both playing in the Belgian First Division B (tier 2) are the only teams left not playing at the highest level. Matches will be played mid-week from 30 November 2021 to 2 December 2021.

Quarter-finals
The draw for the quarter-finals was made right after the conclusion of the last match of the previous round.

Semi-finals
The draw for the semi-finals was made right after the conclusion of the last match of the previous round.

First legs

Second legs

Final

Notes

References

Belgian Cup seasons
Belgian Cup
Cup